This is a partial discography of Fidelio, a Singspiel in two acts by Ludwig van Beethoven. Beethoven had originally written a three-act version of the opera called Leonore, first performed in 1805 and then re-staged with revisions in 1806. Despite the name change, the heroine is the title character in both cases. Leonore disguises herself as a boy, Fidelio, in order to find out what has happened to her husband, Florestan, who is being illegally held by Pizarro, a prison governor. The other major characters are the gaoler Rocco and his daughter Marzelline.

Audio

Video

Audio (1805 version) 
This is a partial discography of Leonore, the 1805 original three-act version of the two-act opera Fidelio.

Audio (1806 version) 
This is a discography of Leonore, the 1806 version of the two-act opera Fidelio.

References

External links 
Discography, LVBeethoven.com. Retrieved 19 January 2010.

Opera discographies
Operas by Ludwig van Beethoven